Andrew Niccol (born 10 June 1964) is a New Zealand screenwriter, producer, and director. He wrote and directed Gattaca (1997), Simone (2002), Lord of War (2005), In Time (2011),  The Host (2013), and Good Kill (2014). He wrote and co-produced The Truman Show, which earned him a nomination for the Academy Award for Best Original Screenplay and won him the BAFTA Award in the same category. His films tend to explore social, cultural and political issues, as well as artificial realities, simulations and the male gaze.

His film Good Kill was selected to compete for the Golden Lion at the 71st Venice International Film Festival.

Early and personal life
Niccol was born in Paraparaumu, New Zealand, and grew up in Auckland, where he attended Auckland Grammar School beginning in 1973. He left New Zealand at age 21 and began directing TV ads in London, which he did for more than ten years before his directorial debut, Gattaca (1997). During production of Simone, he met model and actress Rachel Roberts, with whom he has two children, Jack, born in 2003 (who also played "Young Nicolai" in the 2005 film Lord of War) and Ava, born in 2008.

Career

Directing
Niccol has directed the films Gattaca (1997), Simone (2002), Lord of War (2005), In Time (2011),  The Host (2013), and Good Kill (2014) (reuniting after 17 years with actor Ethan Hawke in a lead role; Hawke also appeared in Lord of War as a supporting character named Jack Valentine). He has also directed a short film entitled The Minutes (2012), which is a documentary-esque, narrative tie-in to In Time that describes in more detail the world and characters from the film.

For his directorial debut and first film (which he also wrote), Gattaca (1997), he won a Best Film award from the Sitges - Catalan International Film Festival and both a Special Jury Prize and the Fun Trophy from the Gérardmer Film Festival.

For his film Lord of War (2005), he received a Special Recognition for Excellence in Filmmaking from the National Board of Review.

In June 2021, Niccol was named as the director and writer of a film based on the Christchurch mosque shootings called They Are Us. The filmmakers' choice to focus on Ardern's response rather than the victims generated criticism within New Zealand. In response to public backlash, Niccols confirmed that the film's development had been put on hold until a full consultation with the New Zealand Muslim community had been conducted.

Writing and producing
Niccol's breakthrough screenplay was his script for the film The Truman Show (1998), directed by Peter Weir and starring Jim Carrey. He also served as a producer on the film. The film received an Academy Award nomination for Best Original Screenplay (Best Writing, Screenplay Written Directly for the Screen) and a Golden Globes nomination for Best Screenplay in 1999 and won a BAFTA award for Best Screenplay, a Saturn Award for Best Writing or Best Writer, an Awards Circuit Community Award for Best Original Screenplay and Best Motion Picture, a Hugo Award for Best Dramatic Presentation (shared with Peter Weir), and an Online Film Critics Society Award for Best Original Screenplay. He has written all the films he has directed and produced several of them.

In 1999, Niccol received the ALFS Award for "Screenwriter of the Year" from the London Critics Circle Film Awards for his screenwriting work on the screenplays of The Truman Show (1998) and Gattaca (1997).

Niccol co-wrote the story for The Terminal, directed by Steven Spielberg. He also served as an executive producer on the film.

Filmography

Awards and nominations

References

External links
 
 Andrew Niccol interview - Contactmusic.com

1964 births
20th-century New Zealand writers
20th-century New Zealand male writers
21st-century New Zealand writers
Best Original Screenplay BAFTA Award winners
English-language film directors
Hugo Award-winning writers
Living people
Male screenwriters
New Zealand film directors
New Zealand screenwriters
People educated at Auckland Grammar School
People from Paraparaumu
Science fiction film directors